A Spendthrift is someone who spends money prodigiously.

Spendthrift or The Spendthrift may also refer to:

 Spendthrift (horse) (1876–1900), American Thoroughbred racehorse and sire
 The Spendthrift (1910 play) by written Porter Emerson Browne
 Spendthrift (film), 1936 American film
 The Spendthrift (1915 film), American silent film drama directed by Walter Edwin
 The Spendthrift (1917 film), Austrian silent historical film directed by Jacob Fleck
 The Spendthrift (1953 film), Austrian historical film directed by Leopold Hainisch
 The Spendthrift (1964 film), Austrian historical film directed by Kurt Meisel

See also
 Spendthrift trust, trust that gives the trustee authority to make decisions on how the funds may be spent
 Spendthrift Farm, thoroughbred race horse breeding farm in Lexington, Kentucky